Kirsten Tan is a New York-based Singaporean film director and screenwriter. She is best known for her 2017 feature film debut, Pop Aye, which won the Special Jury Prize at the Sundance Film Festival, and was Singapore's official submission to the Academy Award for Best Foreign Language Film.

Early life and education 

Tan was born in Singapore to Chinese-educated business parents who wanted her to study science or economics. A bilingual and voracious reader, as a child Tan read Charles Dickens alongside Jin Yong wuxia sword-fighting novels. Of this period she has said: “Reading was my first escape, an immediate access to a larger world.”

As a teenager at Dunman High and Victoria Junior College, Tan wrote short stories and poems, sometimes on toilet paper squares she would flush away. Tan says she was classified as “the oddball, the slacker".

After obtaining her Bachelor's degree in English Literature at the National University of Singapore, Tan studied film production at Ngee Ann Polytechnic, where she would sneak into the restricted section of the film library to “steal” works by Agnès Varda and Wim Wenders.

Korea and Thailand 
Tan lived in Jeonju, South Korea, for a year as part of the Asian Young Filmmakers Forum. After this, she lived for the next two years in Chiang Mai and Bangkok in Thailand. During this time, she made a string of short films, formed a rock band called Century Ache, and had a shop at the Chatuchak Weekend Market where she sold T-shirts.

A Thai fortune-teller once said to Tan: “The gods are confused about where you sleep.”

New York 
Tan moved to New York City in 2005, where she obtained her MFA in Directing at New York University's Tisch School of the Arts.

Tan said that she always felt like a rolling stone in the cities that she moved to and that she never really fit in at those places.

Career 
Tan started her career with short films: 10 Minutes Later (2005), Fonzi (2007), Sink (2009), Cold Noodles (2010), Dahdi (2014) and Still Standing (2018).  Her films are marked by a fascination with time and a bleak humour towards existence. 

In 2017, Tan wrote and directed her debut feature film, Pop Aye. The film centers on a disenchanted architect who unexpectedly reunites with his long-lost elephant on the streets of Bangkok. The unlikely pair embark on a road trip across the country towards the rural farm where they grew up together. Tan has said that the film is "essentially about two wayfaring misfits — in this case, a man past his prime and his displaced street elephant — searching for meaning and belonging in space and time.”

Pop Aye premiered in competition at Sundance as the opening film of the World Dramatic selection, and was awarded a Special Jury Prize for Screenwriting. It went on to pick up the Golden Eye at the Zurich Film Festival for Best International Feature Film and the VPRO Big Screen Award at the International Film Festival Rotterdam. Pop Aye was the first Singaporean film to win a major award at Sundance and also at Rotterdam Film Festival. Prime Minister of Singapore Lee Hsien Loong noted Tan's achievement, congratulating her on social media. The film was also Singapore's official submission to the Academy Award for Best Foreign Language Film.

Tan has also made a short film Wu Song Sha Sao which is entirely in Teochew, a Chinese dialect, as part of Singapore's first dialect film anthology in 2017. 

She is a four time nominee at the Singapore International Film Festival, and was awarded Best Southeast Asian Film for Dahdi, Best Director for Fonzi, and Special Jury Prize for 10 Minutes Later.

Personal life 
Tan lives in Brooklyn, New York and is blind in one eye.

Tan was nominated as a Singaporean of The Year by the Straits Times in 2017.     

Tan is a co-founder of the Asian Film Archive. She has also curated an Ingmar Bergman retrospective for the 2017 Swedish Film Festival in Singapore on the occasion of Bergman's centennial.

Tan has cited Roy Andersson and Kurt Vonnegut as influences.

References

External links 
 
 

Singaporean film directors
Singaporean women film directors
Living people
Year of birth missing (living people)
Victoria Junior College alumni
Dunman High School alumni